Urgedra deserta is a moth of the family Notodontidae. It is found in north-eastern Ecuador.

The length of the forewings is about 17 mm. The ground colour of the forewings is dirty dark brown, with an infusion of glossy, light yellowish green scales. The ground colour of the hindwings is dirty reddish brown, but lighter near the base and along the anal margin.

Etymology
The species name is derived from Latin desertum (meaning desert) and refers to the sandy-colour of the wings.

References

Moths described in 2011
Notodontidae